The 1963–64 Scottish Inter-District Championship was a rugby union competition for Scotland's district teams.

This season saw the 11th Scottish Inter-District Championship.

South won the competition with 3 wins.

1963-64 League Table

Results

Round 1

Glasgow District: 

South:

Round 2

 Edinburgh District: 

North and Midlands:

Round 3

South:

North and Midlands:

Round 4

Glasgow District: 

Edinburgh District:

Round 5

South: 

Edinburgh District:

Round 6

North and Midlands: 

Glasgow District:

Matches outwith the Championship

Trial matches

Blues Trial: 

Whites Trial:

Scotland Probables: 

Scotland Possibles:

References

1963–64 in Scottish rugby union
Scottish Inter-District Championship seasons